Kidulthood (stylised as KiDULTHOOD) is a 2006 British crime drama film directed by Menhaj Huda and written by Noel Clarke, who appeared in the film alongside Aml Ameen, Red Madrell, Adam Deacon, Jaime Winstone, Femi Oyeniran, Madeleine Fairley, Cornell John, Kate Magowan, Pierre Mascolo (who also acted as executive producer), Rafe Spall and Nicholas Hoult. It follows the lives of several teenagers in the West London area Ladbroke Grove. 

Clarke wrote the film in the late 90s based on his own experiences growing in Ladbroke Grove , which he began developing with director Menhaj Huda and producer George Isaac. Filming began on 14th November 2004 and was filmed on location until 16th December. The film is known for featuring breakout roles for Ameen, Clarke, Deacon, Winstone, Oyeniran, Spall and Hoult. 

Made on a budget of £560,000, Kidulthood was released theatrically on 3 March 2006 and received praise and controversy for its depection of teenage life in London. The success of the film led to two sequels: Adulthood (2008) and Brotherhood (2016), both of which were written and directed by Clarke.

Plot
In 2002, at Ladbroke Grove, local school student Katie suffers intense physical and emotional bullying by a group of girls, as well as by another bully, Sam Peel. When her father picks her up from school that day, Sam quietly threatens to kill her if she ever tells anyone. That evening, Katie's older brother Lenny breaks into her room to discover that she has hanged herself.

The following morning, the students are informed of Katie's death and are given the day off to mourn. Trevor "Trife" Hector and his best friends, Jay and Moony, decide to spend it smoking weed and drinking alcohol. Trife's pregnant ex-girlfriend Alisa decides to spend the day with her best friend Becky.

Becky performs oral sex on an older man in return for drugs, and aggressively coaxes Alisa into joining in. The boys make their way to Sam's house on an estate to retrieve a Game Boy Sam had stolen from them the day before. Realising Sam is out, the boys also steal Sam's cannabis and Jay has sex with Sam's girlfriend Claire. Sam returns unexpectedly, but is beaten unconscious by the boys and they knock down Sam's mother as they flee.

Alisa and Becky unexpectedly run into some of Katie's bullies aboard a train. Alisa, feeling bad that she was not there for Katie, berates the girls for the suffering they caused. Becky accidentally reveals that Alisa is pregnant, information that the bullies threaten to spread around school in an effort to humiliate Alisa. At the next station, Alisa hurries off the train to vomit, whilst Becky scorns her for putting her life at risk. Having successfully sold the drugs they acquired earlier, they head to a shopping centre to buy dresses for a party later that evening, before meeting up with the boys. Jay, convinced by Trife that Alisa's baby is Sam's, falsely informs her that Trife wants nothing to do with her. Heartbroken, Alisa asks Becky if they can leave, but Becky insists on going to the party.

At the same time, Trife visits his uncle Curtis, who presents him with a revolver, the same one Trife had drilled the barrel for earlier at school. Downstairs, Andreas, a customer who earlier missed a drugs payment, is tied and beaten by Curtis and Trife. Curtis then orders Trife to carve a "C" into Andreas' face with a Stanley knife in order to test him. Though visibly terrified, Trife carries out his uncle's order, and flees the house traumatised. Trife desperately tries to call Alisa, but is unsuccessful in doing so. On her way home, Alisa runs into a classmate and persuades her to go to the party with her. At the party, Becky is stood up by Moony and fails to convince Jay to have sex with her.

Trevor interrupts Alisa and the other classmate who are kissing outside, and confesses his love for her. Alisa informs Trevor that the baby is definitely his – she had never slept with Sam. The two rekindle their love, but a vengeful Sam arrives at the party and attacks Trife. Alisa hurriedly tells Jay and Moony, who intervene to help Trife. Outside, Sam beats down both Trevor and Jay, whilst intimidating Moony into not interfering. Sam challenges all the other party goers who come out to watch, however Alisa, the only one unafraid of Sam, slaps him. When Sam grabs her by her hair, Trife gets to his feet and fights him to the ground. Alisa pleads with him to stop, and he ambles over to her. Sam takes this opportunity to grab his baseball bat, and delivers a critical blow to Trife's stomach.

As this occurs, Lenny arrives at the party; brandishing a gun, he forces Sam to the ground at gunpoint, and produces the note Katie wrote before she hanged herself. Lenny prepares to kill Sam but Trife stops him with his dying breath, telling him that Sam is not worth it. Sam is almost killed when he insults Lenny after the latter begins to walk away, however the gun fails to fire. Sirens are heard in the distance, so Lenny, his accomplice, and Sam all flee the party as Trife dies before the ambulance and police arrive.

Cast
 Aml Ameen as Trevor 'Trife' Hector
 Red Madrell as Alisa
 Adam Deacon as Jay
 Noel Clarke as Sam Peel
 Jaime Winstone as Becky
 Femi Oyeniran as Moony
 Madeleine Fairley as Claire
 Cornell John as Curtis
 Rafe Spall as Lenny
 Nicholas Hoult as Blake
 Rebecca Martin as Katie
 James Witherspoon as Kilpo
 Ortis Deley as Derek
 Stephanie Di Rubbo as Shaneek
 Kate Magowan as Stella

Production
London hip-hop group Arcane wrote the title track for the film. The soundtrack drew on British hip hop and grime music including The Streets, Roots Manuva, Dizzee Rascal and Lethal Bizzle.

The film was principally shot in the actual areas in which it is set around London W11; for example, some of the school scenes are shot in Twyford CE High School in Acton, similarly Alisa and Becky's journey on the London Underground is between Ladbroke Grove and Royal Oak stations.

Critical reception
Kidulthood has received a generally positive critical response. Writing in The Guardian, Miranda Sawyer called the film "a rollicking UK youth ride, cinematically filmed, persuasively acted and bumped along by a fantastic all-British soundtrack ... It's also very funny, laced with a humour of the slapped-in-the-face-with-a-kipper sort: you can't help laughing because it's so outrageous".

Stephen Armstrong in The Times, said "the only people who should be shocked by this film are people who have never been teenagers. What Kidulthood does is take all the violence, sex and intoxication experienced in a teenage year and condense it into a single day, because that's far more marketable than a film about eight kids spending four hours sitting on the swings wondering what to do". The Daily Mirror described it as being "as potent as a shot of vodka before breakfast – a harrowing, uncompromisingly bleak but thoughtful look at the anguish of being young and poor in Britain".

Sequels

The film spawned a trilogy, receiving two sequels: Adulthood was released in 2008, which was written and also directed by Noel Clarke, and then Brotherhood in 2016.

See also
 4.3.2.1
 West 10 LDN
 Anuvahood
 Ill Manors

References

External links
 
 
 

2006 films
2000s coming-of-age drama films
2000s crime drama films
2006 independent films
2000s teen drama films
Black British films
Black British cinema
Black British mass media
British coming-of-age drama films
British crime drama films
British independent films
British teen drama films
2000s English-language films
Films about interracial romance
Films set in 2002
Films set in London
Films shot in London
Hood films
Films with screenplays by Noel Clarke
Teen crime films
2006 drama films
Films directed by Menhaj Huda
2000s British films